The second series of The Emily Atack Show, is a British comedy television series, which began airing on 7 October 2021 and concluded after six episodes on 11 November 2021. The show was renewed for its second series in March 2021 by ITV. The series follows the same premise as the first instalment in 2020, covering Emily Atack's performances at the Clapham Grand with sketches and impressions.

In February 2022, it was announced the show would return for a third series in the same year.

Cast
All cast members are played by themselves.

 Emily Atack
 Ambreen Razia
 Barney Fishwick
 Bryony Twydle
 Cam Spence
 Cole Anderson-James
 Harry Kershaw
 Holli Dempsey
 James McNicholas
 Jarreau Antoine
 Rebecca Rogers
 Rich Keeble
 Shiloh Coke
 Zadeiah Campbell-Davies

Episodes

References

2021 British television seasons